is a Japanese motorcycle racer. He races in the Asia Road Race SS600 Championship, aboard a Honda CBR600RR.

Career statistics

Grand Prix motorcycle racing

By season

Races by year

References

External links

Japanese motorcycle racers
Moto3 World Championship riders
1997 births
Living people